The Strumpet's Plaything (German: Das Spielzeug einer Dirne) is a 1922 German silent drama film directed by Eugen Illés and starring Colette Corder, Heinrich Schroth and Eduard von Winterstein.

The film's sets were designed by the art director Siegfried Wroblewsky.

Cast
 Colette Corder
 Inge Helgard
 Rolf Lindau
 Heinrich Schroth
 Eduard von Winterstein

References

Bibliography
 Grange, William. Cultural Chronicle of the Weimar Republic. Scarecrow Press, 2008.

External links

1922 films
Films of the Weimar Republic
Films directed by Eugen Illés
German silent feature films
German black-and-white films
1922 drama films
German drama films
Silent drama films
1920s German films
1920s German-language films